Roy Townley Brown (December 13, 1880 – September 3, 1950) was a Canadian professional ice hockey defenseman who was active in the early 1900s. Amongst the teams Brown played for were the Brantford Indians and the Berlin Dutchmen of the OPHL, as well as the Canadian Soo Algonquins of the IPHL where he acted both as team captain and coach.

He was born in Mitchell, Ontario.

Statistics
Exh. = Exhibition games

Statistics per Society for International Hockey Research at sihrhockey.org

References

Notes

External links
The Origins and Development of the International Hockey League and its effect on the Sport of Professional Ice Hockey in North America Daniel Scott Mason, University of British Columbia, 1992

1880 births
1950 deaths
Canadian ice hockey defencemen
Ice hockey people from Ontario
Sault Ste. Marie Marlboros players